Michał Nalepa may refer to:

 Michał Nalepa (footballer, born 1993), Polish footballer playing for Lechia Gdańsk
 Michał Nalepa (footballer, born 1995), Polish footballer playing for Jagiellonia Białystok